The Slovakia National Road Race Championships take place annually and decide the national champion for the year in various categories. The winner of the championship gains the right to wear a distinctive jersey with a Slovak flag during races.

Men

Multiple winners

Elite 
This section contains the list of Slovak road race champions. Since the year 2000, the Slovak championships were combined with the national championships of the Czech Republic. The column Overall winner shows the winner of the joint championship

U23

Women

Elite

Junior

References 

National road cycling championships
Cycle races in Slovakia